Robert Lowe Kunzig (October 31, 1918 – February 21, 1982) was an American attorney, HUAC counsel, and judge of the United States Court of Claims.

Background

Born in Philadelphia, Pennsylvania, Kunzig received an Artium Baccalaureus degree from the University of Pennsylvania in 1939, and a Juris Doctor from the University of Pennsylvania Law School in 1942.

Career

Kunzig served as a captain in the United States Army during World War II from 1942 to 1946. He was a civilian war crimes prosecutor for the United States Government from 1946 to 1947. He was in private practice in Philadelphia from 1948 to 1969. He was deputy attorney general for the State of Pennsylvania from 1948 to 1953. He was counsel for the House Un-American Activities Committee of the United States House of Representatives from 1953 to 1955.

Leading witness Bella Dodd (former teacher and CPUSA leader), Kunzig solicited yes or no answers as follows:    KUNZIG: Are you suggesting that professional people and teachers are handled in a special way?DODD:  Yes, I said in the very beginning–KUNZIG:  –If there was a professor in a college anywhere... his Communist Party membership and his participation in Communist activities would be kept on a highly secret level?DODD: Yes, it would.    He also solicited from her testimony on communist espionage among teachers by querying her about spymaster J. Peters:    KUNZIG: Did you know an individual by the name of J. Peters — and, before you 
answer, I would like to say something on the record about J. Peters. J. Peters, as you know, was the author of the instruction book on espionage. He has been established as head of the Soviet-controlled espionage organization which operated in America. Did you know J. Peters? If so, how did you know him? DODD: Well, that is an interesting question, because I knew of the J. Peters manual before I had read it. It had been given to me to read and study, and I knew a man by the name of Steve Miller, but Steve Miller was an insignificant little fellow who used to help with mimeographing at party headquarters. He was attached to the New York County committee. He was assigned from time to time to teach communism to some of the teachers, kind of take individual teachers who were rising in the party movement and give them special instructions. I thought he was just an insignificant little fellow until one day the authorities picked him up and I discovered he was J. Peters. He was engaged in using teachers throughout the United States for maildrop purposes, for revolutionary mail that was going back and forth from the Soviet Union into the United States.     (The document to which they were referring was The Communist Party:  A Manual on Organization by J. Peter.)

Kunzig was legal adviser to the Chairman and Executive Director of the Civil Aeronautics Board in Washington, D.C. from 1955 to 1958. He was a member of the Foreign Claims Settlement Commission in Washington, D.C. from 1958 to 1961. He was an administrative assistant for United States Senator Hugh Scott from 1963 to 1966. He was executive director of the General State Authority for the State of Pennsylvania from 1967 to 1968. He was Administrator of the General Services Administration from 1969 to 1972.

Additionally, Kunzig managed the United States Senate campaign of United States Senator Hugh Scott in 1964, the campaign of Arlen Specter for District Attorney of Philadelphia in 1965 and the campaign of Raymond P. Shafer for Governor of Pennsylvania in 1966.

Federal judicial service

Kunzig was nominated by President Richard Nixon on November 18, 1971, to a seat on the United States Court of Claims vacated by Judge Don Nelson Laramore. He was confirmed by the United States Senate on December 2, 1971, and received his commission on January 3, 1972. His service terminated on February 21, 1982, due to his death in Washington, D.C. He died in hospital after a short illness.

References

External links
 
 

|-

1918 births
1982 deaths
Lawyers from Philadelphia
Military personnel from Philadelphia
University of Pennsylvania alumni
Judges of the United States Court of Claims
Administrators of the General Services Administration
United States Article I federal judges appointed by Richard Nixon
20th-century American judges
University of Pennsylvania Law School alumni
Nixon administration personnel